Mary Jeanne Coyne (December 7, 1926 – August 6, 1998) was an associate justice of the Minnesota Supreme Court. A fourteen-year veteran of the court (1982-1996), Coyne was born in Minneapolis, Minnesota, graduated from the University of Minnesota, and University of Minnesota Law School. She authored numerous opinions as a Justice. She was the second woman to serve on the Minnesota Supreme Court.

References

1926 births
1998 deaths
Politicians from Minneapolis
Minnesota lawyers
Justices of the Minnesota Supreme Court
University of Minnesota alumni
University of Minnesota Law School alumni
20th-century American judges
Lawyers from Minneapolis
20th-century American lawyers
20th-century American women judges